"Crashed the Wedding" is a song by English pop punk band Busted. It was written by James Bourne and McFly's Tom Fletcher and produced by Steve Power. It was released on 10 November 2003 through Island Records as the lead single from Busted's second studio album A Present for Everyone (2003).

"Crashed the Wedding" became Busted's second single to reach number one on the UK Singles Chart, with first week sales of 55,000, as well as the final UK number one single to be available on cassette. The song is loosely based on the wedding scene in the 1967 film The Graduate and the line "I'm so rushed off my feet, looking for Gordon Street" is a reference to the 1993 film Wayne's World 2. The song was nominated for the People's Choice Award at the 2004 Music Vision Awards.

Music video

The music video, which is all one shot, features Busted playing at a wedding in which nearly all the guests are portrayed by the band members. Busted then go on to destroy the wedding, wrecking the cake and knocking over tables. A scene involving one character spanking another was edited out when the video was aired during the daytime. Before the song begins, a muzak version of Busted's first single "What I Go to School For" is heard. Willis, Bourne and Simpson portray Adam Ant, Michael Jackson and Boy George impersonators respectively. Harry Judd from McFly plays the drummer in the video.

Live performances
The single was also promoted by appearances on Top of the Pops, Top of the Pops Saturday, CD:UK, Popworld, the Royal Variety Performance, Ant & Dec's Saturday Night Takeaway, and as one of the interval acts at Junior Eurovision Song Contest 2003.

Since release
In 2011, the single was chosen by listeners on BBC Radio 1's request show. The song was then campaigned to become the 2011 Christmas number one on Facebook.

Track listings

Personnel
Personnel are taken from the A Present for Everyone album booklet.
 James Bourne – writing
 Tom Fletcher – writing
 Steve Power – production, mixing, programming
 Jim Brumby – engineering
 David Naughton – engineering
 Dan Porter – mixing assistant, assistant recording engineer

Charts

Weekly charts

Year-end charts

Certifications

References

2003 songs
2003 singles
Busted (band) songs
Island Records singles
Number-one singles in Scotland
Song recordings produced by Steve Power
Songs written by James Bourne
Songs written by Tom Fletcher
UK Singles Chart number-one singles
Universal Records singles